James Michael Slezak is a Michigan politician who served in the Michigan state House of Representatives.

Political career
In 2008, Slezak won election to the Michigan state House of Representatives from the 50th District, defeating incumbent Ted Hammon in the Democratic primary.

In 2010, Slezak ran in the 26th State Senate District to replace the term-limited Deborah Cherry. He lost the primary to Paula Zelenko, who in turn lost the general election to Republican David B. Robertson.

Switching parties, Slezak in 2012 ran as a Republican for the 5th Congressional District seat being vacated after 36 years by Dale Kildee; he was defeated in the general election by Kildee's nephew Dan.

References 

Living people
Michigan Democrats
Michigan Republicans
Members of the Michigan House of Representatives
Yale University alumni
1966 births
People from Muskegon, Michigan
People from Genesee County, Michigan
21st-century American politicians